Events in the year 2016 in Monaco.

Incumbents 
 Monarch: Albert II
 Minister of State: Serge Telle

Events 

 21–24 January – the 2016 Monte Carlo Rally, a motor racing event for rally cars, was held in Monaco over four days, the first round of the 2016 World Rally Championship.
 10–17 April – the 2016 Monte-Carlo Rolex Masters, a tennis tournament for male professional players.
 29 May – Lewis Hamilton won the 2016 Monaco Grand Prix.
 1 June – 15,000 2-euro commemorative coins were released into circulation marking the 150th anniversary of the foundation of Monte Carlo by Charles III, Prince of Monaco.
 18–19 June – The 2016 Men's Rugby Sevens Final Olympic Qualification Tournament was held at Stade Louis II in Fontvieille.
 5–21 August – Monaco at the 2016 Summer Olympics: 3 competitors in 3 sports (athletics, gymnastics and judo).

Deaths

See also 

 2016 in Europe
 City states

References 

 
2010s in Monaco
Years of the 21st century in Monaco
Monaco
Monaco